The 1975–76 Cleveland Cavaliers season was the sixth season of the franchise in the National Basketball Association (NBA). This season marked their first winning record, their first playoffs appearances and their first conference finals in history. The season is referred to as the "Miracle at Richfield" season for this reason, and helped propel local interest in the Cavaliers as almost every playoff game was sold-out and regular game attendance would rise in the coming seasons.

Roster

Season standings

Record vs. opponents

Game log

|-style="background:#fcc;"
| 1 || October 23, 1975 || Golden State
|-style="background:#fcc;"
| 2 || October 25, 1975 || @ New York
|-style="background:#cfc;"
| 3 || October 30, 1975 || Chicago

|-style="background:#fcc;"
| 4 || November 1, 1975 || New Orleans
|-style="background:#fcc;"
| 5 || November 4, 1975 || @ Washington
|-style="background:#cfc;"
| 6 || November 6, 19758:05 PM EST || @ Atlanta
| W 113–108
| Snyder (25)
|
|
| The Omni3,761
| 2–4
|-style="background:#cfc;"
| 7 || November 7, 1975 || @ New Orleans
|-style="background:#fcc;"
| 8 || November 8, 1975 || @ Houston
|-style="background:#fcc;"
| 9 || November 11, 1975 || @ Golden State
|-style="background:#fcc;"
| 10 || November 14, 1975 || @ Seattle
|-style="background:#cfc;"
| 11 || November 15, 1975 || @ Portland
|-style="background:#fcc;"
| 12 || November 18, 1975 || Houston
|-style="background:#fcc;"
| 13 || November 20, 1975 || Buffalo
|-style="background:#cfc;"
| 14 || November 22, 1975 || @ New York
|-style="background:#fcc;"
| 15 || November 23, 1975 || Boston
|-style="background:#cfc;"
| 16 || November 25, 1975 || @ Chicago
|-style="background:#fcc;"
| 17 || November 27, 1975 || Kansas City
|-style="background:#cfc;"
| 18 || November 29, 1975 || Seattle

|-style="background:#cfc;"
| 19 || December 2, 1975 || Portland
|-style="background:#fcc;"
| 20 || December 4, 1975 || @ Kansas City
|-style="background:#fcc;"
| 21 || December 5, 1975 || @ Buffalo
|-style="background:#fcc;"
| 22 || December 9, 1975 || @ Philadelphia
|-style="background:#cfc;"
| 23 || December 11, 1975 || New York
|-style="background:#cfc;"
| 24 || December 12, 1975 || @ Milwaukee
|-style="background:#cfc;"
| 25 || December 13, 1975 || New Orleans
|-style="background:#cfc;"
| 26 || December 16, 1975 || @ Los Angeles
|-style="background:#cfc;"
| 27 || December 17, 1975 || @ Seattle
|-style="background:#cfc;"
| 28 || December 19, 1975 || @ Phoenix
|-style="background:#cfc;"
| 29 || December 21, 1975 || Los Angeles
|-style="background:#fcc;"
| 30 || December 26, 19758:00 PM EST  || Atlanta
| L 97–98
| Russell,Walker (17)
|
|
| Coliseum at Richfield19,832
| 15–15
|-style="background:#cfc;"
| 31 || December 27, 1975 || @ Washington
|-style="background:#cfc;"
| 32 || December 28, 1975 || Buffalo
|-style="background:#cfc;"
| 33 || December 30, 1975 || Kansas City

|-style="background:#fcc;"
| 34 || January 2, 1976 || @ Philadelphia
|-style="background:#fcc;"
| 35 || January 3, 1976 || Detroit
|-style="background:#fcc;"
| 36 || January 7, 1976 || @ Detroit
|-style="background:#cfc;"
| 37 || January 8, 1976 || Philadelphia
|-style="background:#cfc;"
| 38 || January 10, 19768:05 PM EST  || @ Atlanta
| W 106–100
| Russell (18)
|
|
| The Omni5,766
| 20–18
|-style="background:#cfc;"
| 39 || January 11, 1976 || Washington
|-style="background:#fcc;"
| 40 || January 14, 1976 || @ Washington
|-style="background:#fcc;"
| 41 || January 15, 19768:00 PM EST  || Atlanta
| L 91–98
| Smith (30)
|
|
| Coliseum at Richfield8,364
| 21–20
|-style="background:#cfc;"
| 42 || January 17, 1976 || Phoenix
|-style="background:#cfc;"
| 43 || January 20, 1976 || Boston
|-style="background:#cfc;"
| 44 || January 22, 1976 || Seattle
|-style="background:#cfc;"
| 45 || January 24, 1976 || Milwaukee
|-style="background:#cfc;"
| 46 || January 27, 1976 || Detroit
|-style="background:#fcc;"
| 47 || January 28, 1976 || @ Houston
|-style="background:#cfc;"
| 48 || January 30, 1976 || @ Chicago

|-style="background:#fcc;"
| 49 || February 1, 1976 || @ New Orleans
|- align="center"
|colspan="9" bgcolor="#bbcaff"|All-Star Break
|-style="background:#cfc;"
| 50 || February 6, 1976 || @ Philadelphia
|-style="background:#cfc;"
| 51 || February 8, 1976 || Washington
|-style="background:#cfc;"
| 52 || February 12, 1976 || Chicago
|-style="background:#cfc;"
| 53 || February 13, 1976 || @ Milwaukee
|-style="background:#cfc;"
| 54 || February 14, 1976 || @ Buffalo
|-style="background:#cfc;"
| 55 || February 17, 19768:00 PM EST  || Atlanta
| W 112–92
| Russell (23)
|
|
| Coliseum at Richfield10,417
| 33–22
|-style="background:#cfc;"
| 56 || February 19, 1976 || Portland
|-style="background:#cfc;"
| 57 || February 22, 1976 || Houston
|-style="background:#fcc;"
| 58 || February 23, 1976 || @ Houston
|-style="background:#cfc;"
| 59 || February 25, 1976 || @ Detroit
|-style="background:#fcc;"
| 60 || February 29, 1976 || @ Los Angeles

|-style="background:#fcc;"
| 61 || March 3, 1976 || @ Phoenix
|-style="background:#cfc;"
| 62 || March 5, 1976 || @ Portland
|-style="background:#fcc;"
| 63 || March 6, 1976 || @ Golden State
|-style="background:#cfc;"
| 64 || March 11, 1976 || Golden State
|-style="background:#cfc;"
| 65 || March 13, 1976 || Phoenix
|-style="background:#fcc;"
| 66 || March 16, 1976 || Los Angeles
|-style="background:#cfc;"
| 67 || March 18, 1976 || Philadelphia
|-style="background:#fcc;"
| 68 || March 19, 1976 || @ New Orleans
|-style="background:#cfc;"
| 69 || March 20, 19768:05 PM EST  || @ Atlanta
| W 113–108
| Chones,Cleamons (20)
|
|
| The Omni3,761
| 41–28
|-style="background:#cfc;"
| 70 || March 21, 1976 || Washington
|-style="background:#fcc;"
| 71 || March 25, 1976 || Buffalo
|-style="background:#fcc;"
| 72 || March 26, 1976 || @ Boston
|-style="background:#cfc;"
| 73 || March 27, 1976 || Milwaukee
|-style="background:#cfc;"
| 74 || March 30, 1976 || Houston
|-style="background:#cfc;"
| 75 || March 31, 1976 || @ New Orleans

|-style="background:#fcc;"
| 76 || April 1, 1976 || Boston
|-style="background:#fcc;"
| 77 || April 3, 1976 || @ Kansas City
|-style="background:#cfc;"
| 78 || April 4, 19763:00 PM EST  || Atlanta
| W 120–92
| Carr (27)
|
|
| Coliseum at Richfield8,439
| 46–32
|-style="background:#cfc;"
| 79 || April 6, 1976 || @ Boston
|-style="background:#cfc;"
| 80 || April 8, 1976 || New Orleans
|-style="background:#cfc;"
| 81 || April 10, 1976 || New York
|-style="background:#fcc;"
| 82 || April 11, 1976 || @ New York

Playoffs

|- align="center" bgcolor="#ffcccc"
| 1
| April 13
| Washington
| L 95–100
| Jim Chones (23)
| Campy Russell (11)
| Jim Cleamons (8)
| Richfield Coliseum19,974
| 0–1
|- align="center" bgcolor="#ccffcc"
| 2
| April 15
| @ Washington
| W 80–79
| Bingo Smith (17)
| Nate Thurmond (10)
| Bingo Smith (4)
| Capital Centre17,988
| 1–1
|- align="center" bgcolor="#ccffcc"
| 3
| April 17
| Washington
| W 88–76
| Smith, Carr (17)
| Jim Brewer (12)
| Jim Brewer (6)
| Richfield Coliseum21,061
| 2–1
|- align="center" bgcolor="#ffcccc"
| 4
| April 21
| @ Washington
| L 98–109
| Campy Russell (22)
| Jim Brewer (10)
| Foots Walker (6)
| Capital Centre17,542
| 2–2
|- align="center" bgcolor="#ccffcc"
| 5
| April 22
| Washington
| W 92–91
| Dick Snyder (26)
| Jim Brewer (12)
| Cleamons, Snyder (4)
| Richfield Coliseum21,312
| 3–2
|- align="center" bgcolor="#ffcccc"
| 6
| April 25
| @ Washington
| L 98–102 (OT)
| Austin Carr (27)
| Jim Brewer (12)
| Cleamons, Carr (5)
| Capital Centre19,035
| 3–3
|- align="center" bgcolor="#ccffcc"
| 7
| April 29
| Washington
| W 87–85
| Dick Snyder (23)
| Jim Brewer (16)
| Jim Cleamons (6)
| Richfield Coliseum21,564
| 4–3
|-

|- align="center" bgcolor="#ffcccc"
| 1
| May 5
| @ Boston
| L 99–111
| Snyder, Russell (21)
| Nate Thurmond (16)
| Jim Cleamons (6)
| Boston Garden14,264
| 0–1
|- align="center" bgcolor="#ffcccc"
| 2
| May 9
| @ Boston
| L 89–94
| Snyder, Smith (16)
| Jim Brewer (9)
| Foots Walker (6)
| Boston Garden12,098
| 0–2
|- align="center" bgcolor="#ccffcc"
| 3
| May 11
| Boston
| W 83–78
| Jim Cleamons (18)
| Jim Brewer (15)
| Nate Thurmond (6)
| Richfield Coliseum21,564
| 1–2
|- align="center" bgcolor="#ccffcc"
| 4
| May 14
| Boston
| W 106–87
| Bingo Smith (27)
| Jim Brewer (11)
| Jim Cleamons (8)
| Richfield Coliseum21,564
| 2–2
|- align="center" bgcolor="#ffcccc"
| 5
| May 16
| @ Boston
| L 94–99
| Jim Cleamons (18)
| Nate Thurmond (10)
| Cleamons, Smith (4)
| Boston Garden12,951
| 2–3
|- align="center" bgcolor="#ffcccc"
| 6
| May 18
| Boston
| L 87–94
| Austin Carr (26)
| Nate Thurmond (14)
| Thurmond, Cleamons (5)
| Richfield Coliseum21,564
| 2–4

Awards and records
 Bill Fitch, NBA Coach of the Year
 Jim Cleamons, NBA All-Defensive Second Team
 Jim Brewer, NBA All-Defensive Second Team

References

Cleveland Cavaliers seasons
Cleveland
Cleveland
Cleveland